The Adıyaman oil field is an oil field located in Adıyaman, Adıyaman Province, Southeastern Anatolia Region. It was discovered in 1982 and developed by Türkiye Petrolleri Anonim Ortaklığı. It began production in 1985 and  produces oil.

References

Oil fields in Turkey
Geography of Adıyaman Province
Buildings and structures in Adıyaman Province
1985 establishments in Turkey